The 1974 Western Australian state election was held on 30 March 1974.

Retiring Members

Labor

 John Brady MLA (Swan)
 Bill Sewell MLA (Geraldton)
 Stan Lapham MLA (Karrinyup)
 Daniel Norton MLA (Gascoyne)
 Bill Willesee MLC (North-East Metropolitan)
 Jerry Dolan MLC (South-East Metropolitan)

Liberal

 Iven Manning MLA (Wellington)
 Ewart Runciman MLA (Murray)
 Sandy Lewis MLA (Blackwood)
 Francis Willmott MLC (South-West)

National Alliance

 Crawford Nalder MLA (Katanning)
 William Manning MLA (Narrogin)
 Edgar Lewis MLA (Moore)
 Harry Gayfer MLA (Avon)
 Les Logan MLC (Upper West)
 Jack Thomson MLC (South)
 Leslie Diver MLC (Central)
 Sydney Thompson MLC (Lower Central)

Legislative Assembly
Sitting members are shown in bold text. Successful candidates are highlighted in the relevant colour. Where there is possible confusion, an asterisk (*) is also used.

Legislative Council
Sitting members are shown in bold text. Successful candidates are highlighted in the relevant colour. Where there is possible confusion, an asterisk (*) is also used.

See also
 Members of the Western Australian Legislative Assembly, 1971–1974
 Members of the Western Australian Legislative Assembly, 1974–1977
 Members of the Western Australian Legislative Council, 1971–1974
 Members of the Western Australian Legislative Council, 1974–1977
 1974 Western Australian state election

References
 

Candidates for Western Australian state elections